El sombrero de tres picos (The Three-Cornered Hat or Le tricorne) is a ballet choreographed by Léonide Massine to music by Manuel de Falla. It was commissioned by Sergei Diaghilev and premiered in 1919. It is not only a ballet with Spanish setting but one that also employs the techniques of Spanish dance (adapted and somewhat simplified) instead of classical ballet.

Composition history 
In 1916-17, Manuel de Falla composed the music for Gregorio Martínez Sierra's two-scene pantomime El corregidor y la molinera (The Magistrate and the Miller's Wife), built on Pedro Antonio de Alarcón's 1874 novel of the same title. The work premiered at Madrid's Teatro Eslava on April 6, 1917.

Sergei Diaghilev of the Ballets Russes had been introduced to de Falla by Igor Stravinsky during the company's first visit to Spain in 1916. He requested permission to use de Falla's already-completed Noches en los jardines de España (Nights in the Gardens of Spain) and the work-in-progress El corregidor y la molinera for future choreographies, but only managed to secure permission for the latter.

In preparation for producing Spanish choreography, Diaghilev and Leonid Massine enlisted the services of dancer Félix Fernández García, who accompanied the two men with de Falla on a tour of Spain in July 1917, introducing them to dancers and performances in Zaragoza, Toledo, Salamanca, Burgos, Sevilla, Córdoba, and Granada. Massine, Pablo Picasso, and de Falla worked separately on the choreography, sets/costumes, and music for the ballet over subsequent months; after some delays, the ballet was eventually premiered in London at the Alhambra Theatre on 22 July 1919. De Falla was called home to Granada at the last moment to see his dying mother; the premiere was conducted in his stead by Ernest Ansermet.

Structure 
The story of a magistrate infatuated with a miller's faithful wife, whom he attempts to seduce, derives from the novella of the same name by Pedro Antonio de Alarcón. Falla did not prepare "suites" from this work although excerpts are performed under this term. The music is in eight main sections, split across an introduction and two parts, or acts, with some bridging scenes: 
Introduction
Part I
2. La tarde (The Afternoon)
3. Danza de la molinera (Dance of the Miller's Wife) (Fandango) — El corregidor — La molinera
4. Las uvas (The Grapes)
Part II
5. La noche (At Night): Danza de los vecinos (Dance of the Neighbors) (Seguidillas)
6. Danza del molinero (Dance of the Miller) (Farruca) — Escena (Allegretto) — Las coplas del cuco (The Cuckoo Couplets) (Nocturno)
7. Danza del corregidor (Dance of the Magistrate) (Minué) — Allegro
8. Danza final (Final Dance) (Jota)

Synopsis

Act I 
After a short fanfare, the curtain rises revealing a mill in Andalusia. The miller is trying to teach a pet blackbird to tell the time. He tells the bird to chirp twice, but instead it chirps three times. Annoyed, the miller scolds the bird and tells it to try again. The bird now chirps four times. The miller gets angry at the bird again and his wife offers it a grape. The bird takes the grape and chirps twice. The miller and his wife laugh over this and continue their work.

Soon the magistrate, his wife, and their bodyguard pass by, taking their daily walk. The procession goes by and the couple returns to their work. The dandified, but lecherous, magistrate is heard coming back. The miller tells his wife that he will hide and that they will play a trick on the magistrate. The miller hides and the magistrate sees the miller's wife dancing. After her dance, she offers him some grapes. When the magistrate gets the grapes, the miller's wife runs away with the magistrate following her. Finally, he catches her, and the miller jumps out of a bush with a stick. The miller chases the magistrate away and the miller and his wife continue working.

Act II 
That night, guests are at the miller's house. The miller dances to entertain them. His dance is interrupted by the magistrate's bodyguard, who has come to arrest him on trumped-up charges. After the miller is taken away, the guests leave one-by-one. The miller's wife goes to sleep and soon the magistrate comes to the mill. On his way to the door, the magistrate trips and falls in the river. The miller's wife wakes up and runs away.

The magistrate undresses, hangs his clothes on a tree, and goes to sleep in the miller's bed. The miller has escaped from prison and sees the magistrate in his bed. The miller thinks that the magistrate is sleeping with his wife and plans to switch clothes with the magistrate and avenge himself by seducing the magistrate's wife. The miller leaves, dressed as the magistrate, and the magistrate soon wakes up. He goes outside and sees that his clothes are gone, so he dresses in the miller's clothes.

The bodyguard comes and sees the magistrate dressed as the miller and goes to arrest him. The miller's wife sees the bodyguard fighting with what looks like her husband and joins in the fight. The miller comes back and sees his wife in the fight and joins it to protect her. The magistrate explains the entire story and the ballet ends with the miller's guests tossing the magistrate up and down in a blanket.

Music 
Throughout the ballet, Falla uses traditional Andalusian folk music. The two songs sung by the mezzo-soprano are examples of cante jondo singing, which typically accompanies flamenco music and tells a sad story. At one point (the farruca), he quotes the opening of Beethoven's 5th Symphony.

Recordings 
There are many recordings of the complete ballet, as well as of the suites extracted from it. In the early 1960s, Ernest Ansermet, the original conductor, recorded it in stereo for London Records. The music was played by the Orchestre de la Suisse Romande and the cante jondo soloist was Teresa Berganza. It has also been recorded by such conductors as Charles Dutoit, Rafael Fruhbeck de Burgos, Jesús López-Cobos, André Previn, Pierre Boulez and Juanjo Mena. Leonard Bernstein has recorded the two suites from the ballet with the New York Philharmonic. (For a comparison of the Previn and Dutoit versions, see here.)

The original pantomime El corregidor y la molinera has been recorded by Josep Pons and Orquestra del Teatro Lliure for Harmonia Mundi.

Film versions 
The Paris Opera Ballet has issued a performance of the complete ballet on a DVD entitled Picasso and Dance. The performance uses not only Massine's original choreography, but actual reproductions of Picasso's sets and costumes.

References

Bibliography 
 Kennedy, Michael (2006). The Oxford Dictionary of Music. Oxford: Oxford University Press. 

Ballets by Léonide Massine
Ballets by Manuel de Falla
Ballets designed by Pablo Picasso
1919 ballet premieres
1919 compositions
1910s in Spanish music